Apartment is a 2010 Indian thriller film directed by Jag Mundhra. The film stars Rohit Roy, Anupam Kher, Tanushree Dutta and Neetu Chandra in the lead roles. The film was released on 23 April 2010, under the banner of Magna Films.

Plot
Preeti Sengupta (Tanushree Dutta) is an air hostess living with her boyfriend Karan Malhotra (Rohit Roy). They share a nice 2BHK apartment in the northern suburbs of Mumbai and are befriended by their elderly neighbor Madhusudan Tanha (Anupam Kher), a struggling poet and lyricist. Tanha is a loner living with his only companion, a Persian cat whom he lovingly calls Shehzadi.

Preeti is possessive and has moronic trust issues. When she stupidly & mistakenly suspects her boyfriend to be unfaithful, she throws him out of the house, but soon realizes she can't afford the apartment rent on her own. On the advice of a fellow airhostess, she advertises for a tenant to share her apartment. Enter Neha Bhardwaj (Neetu Chandra), a modest small-town girl asking for accommodation. Very impressed by her simplicity and respectfulness, Preeti believes she has found a perfect roommate. The two girls soon become close - their camaraderie leads them to become companions.

Then things begin to go disastrously wrong - slowly and steadily. Preeti's seemingly normal life is thrown off gear - with a series of incidents that take her by surprise. Is it just coincidence or is someone deliberately causing all the trouble? Is Neha really as simple as she seems? In the grip of mystery, unforeseen and gruesome events and murder as its heinous best, the truth seems shocking as it unfolds. As Neha and Preeti are torn apart by suspicion, deceit and betrayal, the question is - what is really going on?

Cast
 Rohit Roy as Karan Malhotra
 Anupam Kher as Madhusudan Tanha
 Tanushree Dutta as Preeti Sengupta
 Neetu Chandra as Neha Bhardwaj
 Bobby Darling
 Mushtaq Khan
 Nassar Abdulla
 Jennifer Mayani as an item number
 Udita Goswami (Guest appearance)

Soundtrack

References

External links
 

2010 films
2010s Hindi-language films
Films set in apartment buildings
Films set in Mumbai
2010 thriller drama films
Indian slasher films
Indian thriller drama films
2010 drama films
Films directed by Jag Mundhra